Rancho Verde High School is one of three comprehensive high schools in the Val Verde Unified School District. The school is situated on 38 acres in the southern section of Moreno Valley, California. Rancho Verde represents a community of diverse social and economic backgrounds containing both suburban and rural populations.  the school serves 2,074 students with 24.94 full-time equivalent (FTE) teachers and 83.17 FTE staff.

History 
Rancho Verde High School first opened in the fall of 1991. The school was designed to accommodate 1,800 students. Between 2001 and 2003, two phases of new construction added several new buildings and renovated existing buildings on campus. This construction period included two science buildings, a music/band building, two multi-story classroom buildings, a football stadium, a second gymnasium, a dance studio, and weight rooms.

Accomplishments (updated Spring 2014) 

 National Association of Music Merchants Best communities in Music Award (2012-2013)
 Dr. Olivier Wong Ah Sun - Western Riverside County Association of School Managers (ACSA)- High School Principal of the Year (2012-2013)
 National Advanced Placement Collegeboard Award as District of the Year (2011-2012)
 National AVID Demonstration School (2011-2014)
 US News Best High Schools Bronze Award (2012)
 Full six year WASC Accredited High School (2010-2016)
 CIF Football Central Division Champions 2011 (Finalists 1999, 2010, 2012, 2013)
 CIF State Champions 4 X 100 girls relay (2010)
 CIF Division I Champions Girls Track & Field (2009)
 CIF Boys Basketball Division II Champions (2008)
 Top 15 ranked marching band in southern California, with 4 former students active in the University of California Los Angeles marching band.
 40 football Division I & IAA scholarships.
 2 basketball full Division I scholarships
 30 Male and female track & field full Division I scholarships
 6 former students are currently active in the NFL, Tyron Smith, Damon Cromartie-Smith, D'Aundre Reed, Ronald Powell, Quincy Enuneuwa, & Eric Martin.
 Over 40 clubs, a comprehensive performing arts program, & JROTC.
 An award winning choir program that has performed at New York's Carnegie Hall (under the direction of Dr. Kelli Dower-2009) and participated in the Disneyland Christmas Candlelight Procession and Ceremony (K. Dower 2006-2009; Allyson Huntsman 2014 & 2016).
 Notable past Principals: Mr. Rob Nichols (1997-2000), Dr. Vincent "Scott" Scambray (2000-2005), Mr. Michael McCormick (2005-2009), Dr. Olivier Wong Ah Sun (2009-2013).
 2017 state and division 1 champions in track and field 
Freshmen Football league champions (2015)
 The Rancho Verde High School Crimson Regiment band will perform in the 2020 Rose Parade in Pasadena, CA on New Year's Day.

Sports 
Rancho Verde High School has a wide range of successful athletic programs.
Cross Country
Football (freshman, junior varsity, varsity)
Girls Volleyball (freshman, junior varsity, and varsity)
Boys Volleyball (junior varsity and varsity)
Girls and Boys Tennis (varsity)
Boys and Girls Soccer (junior varsity and varsity)
Boys and Girls Basketball (freshman, junior varsity, and varsity)
Wrestling (junior Varsity and Varsity)
Baseball (junior varsity and varsity)
Softball (junior varsit, and varsity)
Track and Field (junior varsity and varsity)
Swim (novice, junior varsity, and varsity)

Clubs
Rancho Verde High School offers over 40 clubs. Meetings are held during lunch or after school. Clubs cater to students’ cultural and academic interests, as well as offer community-service opportunities. In 2007, the Drama program invited “Stand Up” to perform for the student body. In an effort to promote tolerance, this production explored the struggles some of the cultural and ethnic groups suffer on high school campuses across the country. MEChA has petitioned against Arizona's anti-immigration laws.  In the fall of 2009, GSA presented the National Ally Week to promote acceptance and ASB held a Celebrate Diversity program.

The Associated Student Body organizes the "Every Fifteen Minutes" presentation by contacting community partners such as the Southern California Fair Grounds, Moreno Valley Police Department, AMR Ambulance Service, the local dire department, and parents of student participants, as well as representatives from Mothers Against Drunk Driving (MADD). These partners are involved by promoting student awareness of the consequences of making destructive decisions.

ROTC offers five campus clean-up days throughout the year. Entitled "Operation Ranch Hand," cadets work on campus beautification by picking up any trash and scraping gum off of lunch table surfaces. ROTC participates in a Veteran's Day celebration by attending the Veteran's Parade Air Show at March Air Force Base. Students pass out flyers at the event and assist with parking at the airport.

Drama/Theatre Club produces two shows each year and invites the community to attend. Advertisement is done through flyers and marquee posting.

The Art club sends kids at the Loma Linda Children's Hospital at least five times a year.
The Art club holds exhibits and competitions throughout the year where the community is asked to attend and place bids on the artwork that is being shown. AVID seniors and juniors conduct AVID tutorials at a local middle school every minimum day Wednesday. Students earn community service hours for participating and volunteering in this event.

The Bible Club, with assistance from other clubs on campus, hosts a community rummage sale. This event brings a day of unity for the clubs on campus while promoting community awareness and support for Rancho.

National Honors Society is an academic and service-oriented club designed to honor high achieving students and promote college entrance. Students who are in this club are required to maintain a grade point average 3.2 and above. Students also complete school and community service programs and honor the teachers at the end of every year at a "Teachers' Tea."

Notable alumni
Kyle Fuller (2010) - point guard for Vanderbilt University and author
Ronald Powell (2010) - defensive end for the University of Florida and linebacker for the New Orleans Saints
Tyron Smith (2008) - offensive tackle for the University of Southern California and for the Dallas Cowboys
Da'Mon Cromartie-Smith (2005) - safety for the Pittsburgh Steelers
Larry Ned (1997) - running back for San Diego State University, drafted by the Oakland Raiders in the sixth round of the 2002 National Football League draft and played for the Minnesota Vikings
Rasaun House - California state University Fullerton second team all-American

References

External links 
Official Website
 

High schools in Riverside County, California
Public high schools in California
1991 establishments in California
Educational institutions established in 1991